Transcenders is an American full service music production company established in 2002 by Brian Lapin, Terence Yoshiaki and Mike Fratantuno.

History
Starting in 1995, Fratantuno, Yoshiaki, and Lapin collaborated as founding members of the music group The Black Eyed Peas (BEP). The trio contributed to songwriting as well as touring, including the Grammy-winning "Let's Get It Started", the band's first single "Joints & Jam", "Request + Line", and the #1 hit "Where Is the Love?".

When BEP took a break from touring to record their third album, Elephunk, the three began collaborating on film and television scoring projects and song production for numerous projects.

Credits

Film

Television

Album releases

Commercials
 Target
 AT&T
 Nikon
 Hennessy 
 Volkswagen
 Old Navy 
 Tabasco
 Nike
 Microsoft
 Nissan Pathfinder
 Bud Light
 Coors Light
 Clairol
 Woodbridge Wines

Awards and nominations

External links
 Official website

Record production teams
American television composers
Musical groups established in 2002